The 2019 African Women's Handball Cup Winners' Cup was the 35th edition, organized by the African Handball Confederation, under the auspices of the International Handball Federation, the handball sport governing body. The tournament was held from April 5–14, 2019, at the salles Prince Heritier Moulay El Hassan and 16 Aout in Oujda, Morocco, contested by 8 teams and won by Primeiro de Agosto of Angola.

Draw

Preliminary rounds

Times given below are in CET (UTC+1).

Group A

* Note:  Advance to semi-finals

Group B

* Note:  Advance to semi-finals

Knockout stage
Championship bracket

5-8th bracket

Final standings

See also 
2019 African Women's Handball Champions League

References

External links 
 Tournament profile at goalzz.com
 

African Women's Handball Cup Winner's Cup
2019 in Moroccan sport
African Women's Handball Cup Winners' Cup
International sports competitions hosted by Morocco
African Women's Handball Cup Winners' Cup